Bladel en Netersel is a former municipality in the Dutch province of North Brabant. It covered the villages of Bladel and Netersel.

Bladel en Netersel merged with Hoogeloon, Hapert en Casteren in 1997, to form the new municipality of "Bladel".

References

Municipalities of the Netherlands disestablished in 1997
Populated places in North Brabant
Former municipalities of North Brabant
Bladel